Askhat Tanirbergenovich Rysbekov (Kazakh: Асхат Тәңірбергенұлы Рысбеков; born April 17, 1990, Kazach SSR, Kazakhstan, Almaty), known professionally as V $ X V PRiNCE is a Kazakh rapper, hip hop artist and songwriter.

Biography 
Askhat's upbringing took place in a traditional family in the city of Almaty. From an early age, he was attracted to rap and hip-hop songs, as these musical styles were especially popular in Kazakhstan.

During his studies, he understood that notebooks and books would not become his constant companions in life. Askhat began to make plans for devoting his life to music.

The first popular track was released by the artist in 2015 under the title "#selfmade".

Since 2015, he has been organizing the VERNY group. It was this musical group that brought the guy popularity not only in his native country, but also abroad. As for the Kazakh show business, Askhat attracted special attention, and also took a good position in the country's music charts.

Discography 

 «A$sorti»
 «Не за горами»
 «VERNЫЙ»
 «727»
 «Vol.1»
 «30» (2020)
 NERVЫ (2021)
 NOVЫЙ (2022)

Awards and nominations 

 Victory in the nomination "Breakthrough of the Year" according to Yandex.Music

References 

Russian rappers
1990 births
Living people